The 1979–80 season was the 70th season of competitive football in Germany.

Promotion and relegation

Pre-season

Post-season

National teams

Germany national football team

Euro 1980 qualifying

Euro 1980

Friendly matches

League season

Bundesliga

2. Bundesliga

North

South

DFB–Pokal

Fortuna Düsseldorf won the 1979–80 DFB-Pokal final by defeating 1.

German clubs in Europe

European Cup

Hamburger SV

Hamburger SV finished the 1979–80 European Cup as runners-up losing to Nottingham Forest 0–1 in the 1980 European Cup Final.

European Cup Winners' Cup

Fortuna Düsseldorf

Fortuna Düsseldorf were eliminated in the first round of the European Cup Winners' Cup by Rangers.

UEFA Cup

Five teams from West Germany competed in the UEFA Cup this season.  1. FC Kaiserslautern were eliminated in the quarter-finals.  Bayern Munich, Borussia Mönchengladbach, Eintracht Frankfurt, and VfB Stuttgart made up a semi-finals consisting of only teams from West Germany.  Frankfurt would go on to win the competition with Gladbach finishing as runners-up.

Borussia Mönchengladbach

Borussia Mönchengladbach were runners-up in the UEFA Cup after losing to Eintracht Frankfurt due to the away goals rule.

Eintracht Frankfurt

Eintracht Frankfurt won the UEFA Cup by defeating Borussia Mönchengladbach in the 1980 UEFA Cup Final due to the away goals rule.

VfB Stuttgart

VfB Stuttgart were eliminated in the semi-finals of the UEFA Cup by Borussia Mönchengladbach.

Bayern Munich

Bayern Munich were eliminated in the semi-finals of the UEFA Cup by eventual champions Eintracht Frankfurt.

1. FC Kaiserlsautern

1. FC Kaiserslautern were eliminated in the quarter-finals of the UEFA Cup by Bayern Munich.

Sources

 
Seasons in German football